Omar Israel Jaime Vera (born 20 April 1981) is a Mexican former footballer, who last played as defender for Estudiantes de Altamira as their captain in Liga de Ascenso.

Career
Omar began his career in the Cruz Azul youth system, playing with Cruz Azul Oaxaca in 2003. He then made a move to Chiapas, where he played with their filial team, Jaguares de Tapachula. He eventually made his first team debut on 27 February 2005 in a 1–0 loss to Puebla FC.

Jaime later moved to Petroleros de Salamanca, where he anchored the team's defense and eventually went on to captain the team, leading them to the Apertura 2006 final, where Petroleros missed out on being promoted to the top flight by losing to Puebla, the team Jaime debuted against.

When Salamanca relocated to La Piedad, Omar Jaime left as well, bringing his captaincy with him.

International career
Jaime was part of the Mexican U-17 squad in the 1997 FIFA U-17 World Championship held in Egypt. Mexico was grouped with Spain, Mali, and New Zealand. He did not see any action in the games, as Mexico was eliminated in the first round.

External links
 
 

1981 births
Living people
Association football defenders
Chiapas F.C. footballers
Salamanca F.C. footballers
La Piedad footballers
Altamira F.C. players
Correcaminos UAT footballers
Liga MX players
Ascenso MX players
Footballers from Nuevo León
Sportspeople from Monterrey
Mexican footballers